Helgøya (or sometimes Helgøy) may refer to several places in Norway:

Helgøy, a former municipality in Troms county
Helgøy Church, a church in Karlsøy municipality, Troms county
Helgøya, Innlandet, a large island in Ringsaker municipality, Innlandet county
Helgøya Church, a church in Ringsaker municipality, Innlandet county
Helgøy (Rogaland), an island in Stavanger municipality, Rogaland county
Helgøya (Vestland), an island in Kinn municipality, Vestland county
Helgøya (Troms), an island in Karlsøy municipality, Troms county
Helgøya (Agder), an island in Kristiansand municipality, Agder county